Estrées-lès-Crécy (literally Estrées near Crécy) is a commune in the Somme department in Hauts-de-France in northern France.

Geography

Railway
There was a railway station (Crécy-Estrées) on the branch of the Réseau des Bains de Mer which ran between Abbeville and Dompierre-sur-Authie. It opened on 19 June 1892 and closed to passengers on 10 March 1947. It closed to freight on 1 February 1951.

Population

See also
Communes of the Somme department

References

Communes of Somme (department)